Cardboard Gangsters is a 2017 Irish crime film set in Darndale, Coolock, Dublin.  It was funded by Broadcasting Authority of Ireland.

Plot 
The film follows Jay and his friends as they attempt to take control of the Darndale drug trade from Murphy, who has controlled the Darndale drug trade for the last 30 years.

24 year old Jayson "Jay" Connelly, who lives with his friends in Darndale, Coolock with his friends Dano, Glenner and Cobbie; learns he is cut off from unemployment benefits due to a recent DJing gig. To make matters worse, he finds out his mother has been taking loans from Derra Murphy, the local crime lord, to pay for her debts and bills. Jay and his friends begin procure and deal drugs on Darndale territory, spiting Derra. All the while, Jay strikes up a relationship with Kim Murphy, Derra's wife, which ruins his budding relationship with Sarah, his girlfriend.

Kim is beaten to a pulp over her affair with Jay. Derra invites Jay over to his house with a job offer, only to be rebuffed by Jay at gunpoint. Enraged by the insult, Sean Murphy, Derra's hotheaded son, murders Cobbie in response. Jay and his crew retaliate by kidnapping and killing Sean. Glenner flees the suburbs, leaving Dano and Jay behind. Derra and his crew hunt down and kill Dano as Jay takes his family and Sarah, pregnant with their child, on the run. While at the airport, Jay receives a phone call from Kim, asking him to rescue her from the Murphy household. Allowing Sarah and his mum to go first, Jay goes back to pick Kim up out of guilt. It turns out to be a trap: Kim betrays him to Derra's gang for murdering her son. Jay is taken to the lake where he killed Sean and executed, the last thing he sees being the plane taking his loved ones to safety.

Cast
 John Connors as Jayson "Jay" Connolly
 Fionn Walton as Dano
 Paul Alwright as Glenner
 Ryan Lincoln as Cobbie
 Jimmy Smallhorne as Derra Murphy
 Ciaran McCabe as Sean Murphy
 Damien Dempsey as Curly Murphy
 Fíonna Hewitt Twamley as Angela Connolly
 Kierston Wareing as Kim Murphy
 Gemma-Leah Devereux as Roisin
 Kyle Bradley Donaldson as Stephen Kelly
 Lydia McGuinness as Christina
 Toni O'Rourke as Sarah

Reception
On the review aggregator website Rotten Tomatoes, the film holds an approval rating of 94% based on 18 reviews, and an average rating of 6.7/10. Moreover, it earned €550,000 at the national box office and became the most viewed Irish film of 2017.

See also
 Paper tiger

References

External links
 
 

Darndale
2017 films
English-language Irish films
Irish crime films
2017 crime films
Films about organised crime in Ireland
2010s English-language films